Bojan Sanković (born 21 November 1993) is a Montenegrin professional footballer who plays for Hungarian Zalaegerszegi TE.

Playing career

Club
On 6 January 2020, Újpest FC confirmed that Sanković had left the club to join FC Irtysh Pavlodar, with the deal being confirmed on 11 January 2020.

Career statistics

Club

Honours
Újpest
 Hungarian Cup (1): 2013–14

References

 MLSZ 
 

1993 births
Living people
Sportspeople from Knin
Serbs of Croatia
People from the Republic of Serbian Krajina
Montenegrin people of Serbian descent
Association football midfielders
Montenegrin footballers
OFK Titograd players
Újpest FC players
FC Irtysh Pavlodar players
Zalaegerszegi TE players
Montenegrin First League players
Nemzeti Bajnokság I players
Kazakhstan Premier League players
Montenegrin expatriate footballers
Expatriate footballers in Hungary
Montenegrin expatriate sportspeople in Hungary
Expatriate footballers in Kazakhstan
Montenegrin expatriate sportspeople in Kazakhstan